Frank Anthony Moretti (1943–2013) was a Professor of Communications, Computing, and Technology at Teachers College, Columbia University and Visiting Professor in the Columbia University School of Journalism.

He was a researcher in the area of new media teaching and learning and the use of digital technology in education, as well as co-founder and Executive Director of the Columbia Center for New Media Teaching and Learning. He earned a Ph.D. in History and an M. Phil from Columbia University, an M.Ed. from Teachers College and a B.A. in Greek and Latin from St. Bonaventure University. Dr. Moretti's 1983 dissertation was entitled "Augustus and Vergil: Pietas and the Pedagogy of Power". In 2012, Dr. Moretti published a work on the communications theorist James W. Carey, co-authored by Annie Rudd, entitled "James W. Carey: Sentinel of Democracy".

Early life and education 
From his birth late in 1943 through high school, Frank A. Moretti lived in West New York, just across the Hudson River from Manhattan. He grew up, an only child of older parents, interacting with an extended family, mastering cameras and the darkroom mentored by a New York sports photographer. After high school, he went to St. Bonaventure, where he majored in Classics, graduating in 1965. Then he obscurely entered the New York intellectual scene, building his presence there.

Moretti had a deep love of teaching and through many outward moves, he maintained a continuous presence in one or another classroom. In 1966 he started as an instructor in Greek and Latin at St. Peter’s Prep in Jersey City. Then a year later he careened back and forth to St. Bonaventure in western New York as an instructor there, and then he worked at Adelphi University for three years. In 1966, he had entered graduate school in classics at Columbia, shifting in the fall of 1968 to a Ph.D. program in the history of education at Teachers College.

Career 
Somewhat paradoxically, from these beginnings, Moretti became an independent teacher and a professional student. He never molded himself for a standard academic career, but through the force of energy, intellect, and personality he turned the adjunct’s path into a succession of productive opportunities, among them at Barnard College (1970–73), at Bloomfield College (1973–75), in a variety of instructional/administrative roles at the NYU School of Continuing Education (1971-1994), through diverse courses at Teachers College, Columbia University (1981-2013), as assistant and associate headmaster at the Dalton School (1981-1997), and finally as executive director of the Columbia Center for New Media Teaching and Learning (1999-2013). Whatever the position and its responsibilities, Moretti relished engaging them as educator, marveling at his good fortune at earning a good living for continuously pursuing his own education in the company of others.

As a committed intellectual, Moretti was productive and influential despite having a limited record as an academic writer. He slowly, persistently wrote an excellent dissertation on Augustus and Vergil, having started it in 1973 and defending it in 1983. Daily, he would read literary and scholarly works in energetic bursts, filling the margins with his forceful argumentation, appreciation, and unexpected asides. He was an alert, active administrator, attuned to an end in view, but even more to the quality of mind, attention, and commitment in those with whom he worked. In paintings, photos, memos, phone calls, meetings, talks, lectures, occasional essays, and multimedia study environments he expressed both his self and his learning, and thereby left his mark.

External links
 Columbia's Center for New Media Teaching and Learning
 Frank A. Moretti: A Classicist as Educational Innovator Symposium - November 18, 2013

References

1943 births
2013 deaths
Teachers College, Columbia University faculty
Teachers College, Columbia University alumni
Digital technology